Taegyo station is a railway station in Ch'angsong-dong, Anju-si, South P'yŏngan Province, North Korea. It is on located on the P'yŏngŭi Line of the Korean State Railway.

History
The station was originally opened on 16 July 1938 by the Chosen Government Railway.

References

Railway stations in North Korea